Jennifer Robinson may refer to:

 Jennifer Robinson (figure skater) (born 1976), Canadian figure skater
 Jennifer Robinson (lawyer) (born 1981), Australian human-rights lawyer
 Jennifer Kaytin Robinson, American actress, director, producer, and writer
 Jenny Robinson, character in The Adventures of the Wilderness Family

See also
 Jennifer Roberson, American author
 Jennifer Robertson, Canadian actress, writer, and comedian